Sharon L. Wylie (born July 12, 1949) is an American politician of the Democratic Party. She is a member of the Washington House of Representatives, representing the 49th district.

References

Democratic Party members of the Washington House of Representatives
Living people
Women state legislators in Washington (state)
Democratic Party members of the Oregon House of Representatives
Women state legislators in Oregon
1949 births
University of California, Riverside alumni
Politicians from Vancouver, Washington
21st-century American politicians
21st-century American women politicians